Lekhani is a Village Development Committee in Baglung District in the Dhaulagiri Zone of central Nepal. At the time of the 1991 Nepal census it had a population of 2,431 and had 507 houses in the village.

References

Populated places in Baglung District